Water End Swallow Holes is a biological site of Special Scientific Interest in Hertfordshire, south-east England. Located in Welham Green and under the planning authority of Welwyn Hatfield District Council, it has an area of 11.3 hectares (27.9 acres).

The site covers more than fifteen swallet holes, the only ones in chalk which are a permanent feature of the landscape. Next to the holes is a swamp area of willow carr which is biologically important, and in deep water there is reed sweet-grass. The site also has areas of woodland and grassland. From the sinkholes the waters become the River Colne.

There is access to the site from Station Road.

See also
List of Sites of Special Scientific Interest in Hertfordshire

References

Water End Swallow Holes
Water End Swallow Holes
Welwyn Hatfield